Cade Lakes is an unincorporated community and census-designated place (CDP) in Burleson County, Texas, United States. It was first listed as a CDP in the 2020 census with a population of 507.

It is in the western part of the county, built around three small reservoirs on Second Davidson Creek, an east-flowing tributary of Davidson Creek and part of the Brazos River watershed.

References 

Populated places in Burleson County, Texas
Census-designated places in Burleson County, Texas
Census-designated places in Texas